Sweeping Up the Spotlight: Live at the Fillmore East 1969 is the 2007 release of songs from the Jefferson Airplane concerts at New York's Fillmore East, recorded on November 28 & 29 1969. It is also the first American release for the band since 1998, and was assembled by the band's manager, Bill Thompson.  It should not be confused with the similarly named Live at the Fillmore East, a recording of a Jefferson Airplane concert given the previous year.

Track listing

Personnel
Marty Balin – vocals, guitar
Grace Slick – vocals, piano
Jorma Kaukonen – lead guitar, vocals
Paul Kantner – rhythm guitar, vocals
Jack Casady – bass
Spencer Dryden – drums

References

Live at the Fillmore East albums
Jefferson Airplane live albums
2007 live albums
RCA Records live albums